Najmul Hossain Shanto (born 25 August 1998) is a Bangladeshi cricketer. 

He is the second Bangladeshi to score a century in domestic Twenty20s after Sabbir Rahman. 

In December 2015, he was named in Bangladesh's squad for the 2016 Under-19 Cricket World Cup. He was also selected for the ICC T20 World Cup 2022 and scored the most runs (180 runs in 5 matches) from Bangladesh cricket team.

Early and personal life
Shanto comes from Ranhat in Rajshahi, and began his cricket training at the Clemon Rajshahi Cricket Academy. The academy was almost 20 kilometers away from his home, so he would cycle and walk each day to get there. 

He married Sabrin Sultana Ratna in 2020 during the lockdown of the COVID-19 pandemic.

Domestic career
He made his Twenty20 (T20) debut on 8 November 2016 playing for Comilla Victorians in the 2016–17 Bangladesh Premier League.

In December 2017, he and Mizanur Rahman, batting for Rajshahi Division against Dhaka Metropolis in the 2017–18 National Cricket League, made the highest opening partnership in a domestic first-class match in Bangladesh, scoring 341 runs.

He was the leading run-scorer in the 2017–18 Dhaka Premier Division Cricket League, with 749 runs in 16 matches.

In October 2018, he was named in the squad for the Khulna Titans team, following the draft for the 2018–19 Bangladesh Premier League. In August 2019, he was one of 35 cricketers named in a training camp ahead of Bangladesh's 2019–20 season. In November 2019, he was selected to play for the Khulna Tigers in the 2019–20 Bangladesh Premier League.

On 8 December 2020, in the 2020–21 Bangabandhu T20 Cup, Najmul scored a century for Minister Group Rajshahi against Fortune Barishal.

International career
In November 2016, he was named in a 22-man preparatory squad to train in Australia, ahead of Bangladesh's tour to New Zealand. In January 2017 he was added to Bangladesh's Test squad ahead of the second Test against New Zealand. He made his Test debut in the second Test against New Zealand on 20 January 2017.

In August 2018, he was one of twelve debutants to be selected for a 31-man preliminary squad for Bangladesh ahead of the 2018 Asia Cup. He made his One Day International (ODI) debut for Bangladesh against Afghanistan on 20 September 2018.

In December 2018, he was named in Bangladesh's team for the 2018 ACC Emerging Teams Asia Cup. After being dropped from the team since 2018 Asia Cup, he was again recalled for the 2019–20 Bangladesh Tri-Nation Series. He made his T20I debut for Bangladesh, against Zimbabwe, on 18 September 2019.

In November 2019, he was named as the captain of Bangladesh's squad for the 2019 ACC Emerging Teams Asia Cup in Bangladesh. Later the same month, he was named as the captain of Bangladesh's squad for the men's cricket tournament at the 2019 South Asian Games. The Bangladesh team won the gold medal, after they beat Sri Lanka by seven wickets in the final.

In April 2021, in the opening match of the two-match series against Sri Lanka, he scored his first century in Test cricket, with 163 runs in the first innings.

In July 2021, Shanto scored his second test hundred against Zimbabwe in Harare.

References

External links
 

1998 births
Living people
Bangladeshi cricketers
Bangladesh Test cricketers
Bangladesh One Day International cricketers
Bangladesh Twenty20 International cricketers
People from Rajshahi District
Abahani Limited cricketers
Kala Bagan Cricket Academy cricketers
Bangladesh North Zone cricketers
Rajshahi Division cricketers
Comilla Victorians cricketers
Khulna Tigers cricketers
South Asian Games gold medalists for Bangladesh
South Asian Games medalists in cricket